Roofers is the debut album of New Zealand band, Breaks Co-op, released in 1997 under music label Deepgrooves Entertainment and then re-released in 2005 under EMI.

Track listing
Looking Forward
To Faraway Lands featuring DJ Manuel Bundy
Sound Advice 
Perpetual Breath 
Let Your Hair Down 
Solids 
Unfettered Mind 
Live At The Lister 
Charging The Depth featuring Nick Atkinson (piano)
Such The Spot featuring Nick Atkinson (saxophone)
Transister featuring Jordan Reyne

References

1997 debut albums
Breaks Co-Op albums